Deborah Charlesworth  (née Maltby; born 1943) is a population geneticist from the UK, notable for her important discoveries in population genetics and evolutionary biology. Her most notable research is in understanding the evolution of recombination, sex chromosomes and mating system for plants.

Early life and education 
Charlesworth grew up in a London suburb, and from a young age was very interested in the natural world around her.

Charlesworth initially studied biochemistry, however genetic variation played a significant role since the beginning her research. Charlesworth obtained her doctorate at Cambridge University in 1968 with her thesis focusing on the quantitative genetics of mice, specifically the extent of genetic variation in the blood glucose levels across natural strains. This also happened to be the topic of her first study. Charlesworth continued her education at Cambridge and Chicago as a research fellow in human genetics examining amino acid variations in hemoglobins in human populations. Charlesworth's interest in evolutionary biology continued through her collaboration with Brian Charlesworth, specifically their works on mimicry systems and recombination rates causing her to shift her focus to evolution. She continued her post-doctoral research at, University of Chicago, Liverpool University, Sussex University as Brian Charlesworth took positions at each, causing Debrah to do research without Grant support. She was mentored at Cambridge by Hermann Lehmann.

At the age of 45, Charlesworth obtained her first faculty position teaching at University of Chicago from 1988–1997. By this time, Charlesworth had already published ~50 articles. Following this position, Charlesworth left to take up a Professorial Research Fellowship at the University of Edinburgh. She is best known for her work on the evolution of genetic self-incompatibility in plants and is recognised as a leader in that field. According to the Web of Science she has published over 300 articles in peer-reviewed journals. These articles have been cited over 10,000 times and she has an h-index of 53. She has been married since 1967 to the British evolutionary biologist Brian Charlesworth, who she ended up working in population genetics with.

Awards and honors
Charlesworth was elected a Fellow of the Royal Society of Edinburgh in 2001 and a Fellow of the Royal Society (FRS) in 2005
In 2011, Charlesworth was awarded the Molecular Ecology Prize. Charlesworth was awarded the Genetics Society Medal 2019. She was awarded 
a Lifetime Achievement Award by the Society for the Study of Evolution in January 2020.
In 2022, she was elected to the National Academy of Sciences.

Selected publications
 Charlesworth, D,Wright, SI. (2001) Breeding systems and genome evolution. Current Opinion in Genetics & Development 11, 685–690.
 Jesper S. Bechsgaard, Vincent Castric, Deborah Charlesworth, Xavier Vekemans, Mikkel H. Schierup. 2006. The transition to self-compatibility in Arabidopsis thaliana and evolution within S-haplotypes over 10 million years. Molecular Biology and Evolution 23: 1741–1750.
 Asher D. Cutter, Scott E. Baird and Deborah Charlesworth. 2006 Patterns of nucleotide polymorphism and the decay of linkage disequilibrium in wild populations of Caenorhabditis remanei. Genetics 174: 901–913.
 Bergero, R., A. Forrest, E. Kamau, and D. Charlesworth. 2007. Evolutionary strata on the X chromosomes of the dioecious plant Silene latifolia: evidence from new sex-linked genes. Genetics 175:1945-1954.
 D. Charlesworth 2006 Balancing selection and its effects on sequences in nearby genome regions. PLoS Genetics 2: e64 DOI: 10.1371/journal.pgen.0020064.
 S. Qiu, R. Bergero, A. Forrest, V. Kaiser, D. Charlesworth 2010 Nucleotide diversity in Silene latifolia autosomal and sex-linked genes. Proceedings of the Royal Soc. 277: 3283-3290 (doi:10.1098/rspb.2010.0606).
 Bergero, R., and D. Charlesworth, 2011 Preservation of the Y transcriptome in a 10MY old plant sex chromosome system. Current Biology 21: 1470–1474.
 Jordan, C., and D. Charlesworth, 2012 The potential for sexually antagonistic polymorphism in different genome regions. Evolution 66: 505–516. DOI: 10.1111/j.1558-5646.2011.01448.x

References

Bibliography 
 Introduction to Plant Population Biology (with Jonathan W Silvertown) 
 Evolution: A Very Short Introduction (with Brian Charlesworth) OUP

External links
 Homepage

1943 births
20th-century British biologists
21st-century British biologists
20th-century British women scientists
21st-century British women scientists
Academics of the University of Edinburgh
Alumni of Newnham College, Cambridge
British women biologists
Fellows of the Royal Society
Fellows of the Royal Society of Edinburgh
Female Fellows of the Royal Society
Living people
Population geneticists
University of Chicago faculty
Women evolutionary biologists